The winner of the Miss Israel beauty pageant in 1968 was Miri Zamir.

Results

References

External links

1968 beauty pageants
1968 in Israel
Miss Israel